St. Paul's High School is a Jesuit Roman Catholic all-boys university preparatory high school in Winnipeg, Manitoba. The school has approximately 600 students attending and has an active 12,000+ alumni community.

History

St Paul's High School was founded in 1926. Its first location was on Selkirk Avenue; in 1931, the school moved to a larger campus on Ellice Avenue, allowing for dormitory and field space. In 1958 the college section moved to the University of Manitoba Fort Gary campus; it was clear that the school needed a more modern facility and that the need for a student residence was fading.

In 1964, the high school relocated to its current location at 2200 Grant Avenue in the Winnipeg neighbourhood of Tuxedo.

During the early 1980s, the Jesuit residence was converted into the Monaghan Wing to create additional classroom and teacher preparation space; at the same time, the science laboratories were improved. At the turn of the century, the school responded to the need for more diverse education, and so the Jesuit Legacy Campaign led to the Angus Reid Centre, which includes new classrooms, art, and band rooms, a multimedia lab, a new cafeteria and Crusader locker rooms. By 2007, the burgeoning number of extramural sports teams, fueled by the almost doubled school population from the 1970s, led to the June 2013 opening of the Paul Albrechtsen Multiplex, which holds a state-of-the-art fitness facility, regulation-size basketball court, athletic therapy centre, and a beach volleyball court.

Today, the school has a 14-acre campus, 33,000 square feet of classroom space, and a 1,800-square-foot music and art room.

Academics
St. Paul's High School exceeds the requirements of the Manitoba Provincial High School curriculum. Course offerings include over 60 elective courses. The school also offers Advanced Placement courses and examinations in subjects such as mathematics, language arts, French, and physics.

Notable alumni

 Reg Alcock '66, federal cabinet minister under Paul Martin
 Donovan Alexander '03, Edmonton Eskimos defensive back
 Paul Baxter, NHL and WHA defenceman, NHL assistant coach
 Greg Bryk, actor (A History of Violence, Saw V, Men With Brooms)
 Mark Chipman '78, founder and chairman of True North Sports & Entertainment, Governor of Winnipeg Jets 
 Gary Doer '66, former premier of Manitoba and former ambassador to the U.S.
 Chris Driedger '12, professional hockey player for the Seattle Kraken
 John Ferguson Jr., ex-general manager of the Toronto Maple Leafs, MHSAA Darts semi-finalist (1986)
 George R. D. Goulet, best-selling Métis author
 Glenn Joyal '78, chief justice of the Court of King's Bench of Manitoba
 Mark Kingwell, political philosopher, University of Toronto
 Angus Reid, founder of the Angus Reid Group, now known as Ipsos-Reid
 Paul Soubry '80, CEO of NFI Group
 Michael St. Croix '11, New York Rangers
 Duvie Westcott, Columbus Blue Jackets defenceman
 Daniel Woolf '76, principal of Queen's University

References
Richard Ford,  Canada (New York,  2013)
St. Paul's High Scool Admissions Handbook

External links
 

Boys' schools in Canada
High schools in Winnipeg
Jesuit secondary schools in Canada
Educational institutions established in 1926
Private schools in Manitoba
Catholic secondary schools in Manitoba
1926 establishments in Manitoba
Tuxedo, Winnipeg